Gardiki Castle is a 13th-century Byzantine castle on the southwestern coast of Corfu and the only surviving medieval fortress on the southern part of the island. It was built by a ruler of the Despotate of Epirus, and was one of three castles which defended the island before the Venetian era (1401–1797). The three castles formed a defensive triangle, with Gardiki guarding the island's south, Kassiopi Castle the northeast and Angelokastro the northwest

Origins and location

The castle dates from the thirteenth century and is located on a low hill near the village of Agios Matthaios, which is situated at a higher elevation. The ruler responsible for the construction of the castle is not known, but it is assumed that it was built either by Michael I Komnenos or his son Michael II Komnenos, rulers of the Despotate of Epirus. Immediately to the south of the castle lies Korissia Lake which is separated from the sea by a narrow strip of land. 

Remains from the upper Paleolithic era, dating from 20,000 B.C., when Corfu was still united to the mainland region of Epirus, were found on the site of the castle at the rock shelter of Grava Gardikiou, including hunter-gatherer stone tools and animal bones, which have since been removed and are exhibited at the Archaeological Museum of Corfu.

The location of Gardiki at the narrow southwest flank of Corfu provided protection to the fields and the southern lowlands of Corfu and in combination with Kassiopi Castle on the northeastern coast of the island and Byzantine Angelokastro protecting the northwestern shore of Corfu, formed a triangular line of defence which protected Corfu during the pre-Venetian era.

Architecture

The walls of Gardiki Castle form an octagon and the structure features eight strong towers decorated by rows of tiles. There are elements from an ancient structure which have been incorporated into the construction of the castle. The ancient structure was probably a fountain-house.

The eight towers are square in shape and the outline of the octagonal structure is almost elliptical. At the top of the southern tower there are traces of a chapel with remnants of religious frescoes of portraits of saints. Although in a state of disrepair, the towers still retain their full height. The castle entrance is preserved but the interior is in a state of ruin.

Gardiki Castle is considered one of the most imposing architectural remains in the Ionian Islands,  along with Angelokastro, Kassiopi Castle and the two Venetian Fortresses of Corfu City, the Citadel and the New Fort.

Historical reference
Corfiote noble Andrea Marmora, the earliest historian of Corfu in medieval times, in his 1672 book Della Historia di Corfù mentions that the despots of Epirus adorned the city of Corfu with "most noble buildings" and built defences in other places on the island, including the fortresses of Gardiki and Angelokastro amongst other important sites.

Architectural highlights

References

Buildings and structures completed in the 13th century
History of Corfu
Byzantine castles in Greece
Buildings and structures in Corfu
Tourist attractions in the Ionian Islands (region)
Hill castles
Despotate of Epirus
13th-century fortifications in Greece